The Hannan Range is a mountain range in Pershing County, Nevada.

References 

Mountain ranges of Pershing County, Nevada
Mountain ranges of Nevada